Lytorhynchus paradoxus, commonly known as the Sindh awl-headed snake and the Sind longnose sand snake, is a species of snake in the family Colubridae. The species is native to the desert areas of Pakistan and India (Rajasthan).

Description

The snout of L. paradoxus is long and acutely pointed. The rostral has a lateral cleft. The suture between the internasals is shorter than that between the prefrontals and shorter than the upper part of the rostral. The frontal is nearly as long as its distance from the end of the snout, as long as the parietals. The supraocular is narrow. There are three preoculars and two postoculars. The temporals are arranged 2+2 or 2+3. There are 8 upper labials, the fifth entering the eye. There are 4 lower labials in contact with the anterior chin shields. The anterior chin shields are shorter but much broader than the posterior chin shields.

The dorsal scales are in 19 rows at midbody. The ventrals are slightly angulate laterally, and number 169-175. The anal is divided. The subcaudals number 40-53.

The body is cream-coloured above, with a dorsal series of transverse brown spots and a less distinct lateral series of smaller spots on each side. There is a large rhomboidal brown spot on the back of the head, and a brown band behind the eye. The lower parts are white .

Reproduction
L. paradoxus is oviparous.

References

Further reading
Agarwal I, Iyengar A (2013). "Further Records of the Sindh Awl-Headed Snake, Lytorhynchus paradoxus (Günther; 1875), from India with Notes on its Habitat and Natural History". Russian Journal of Herpetology 20 (3): 165–170.
Bhide K, Captain A, Khandal D (2004). "First record of Lytorhynchus paradoxus (Günther, 1875) from the Republic of India, with notes on its distribution". Hamadryad 28 (1&2): 123-127.
Boulenger GA (1893). Catalogue of the Snakes in the British Museum (Natural History). Volume I. Containing the Families ... Colubridæ Aglyphæ, part. London: Trustees of the British Museum (Natural History). (Taylor and Francis, printers). xiii + 448 pp. + Plates I–XXVIII. (Lytorhynchus paradoxus, p. 416).
Günther A (1875). "Second Report on Collections of Indian Reptiles obtained by the British Museum". Proceedings of the Zoological Society of London 1875: 224-234. (Acontiophis paradoxa, new species, pp. 232–233, Figure 5).
Murray JA (1884). "Additions to the Reptilian Fauna of Sind". Annals and Magazine of Natural History, Fifth Series 14: 106-111.
Smith MA (1943). The Fauna of British India, Ceylon and Burma, Including the Whole of the Indo-Chinese Sub-region. Reptilia and Amphibia. Vol. III.—Serpentes. London: Secretary of State for India. (Taylor and Francis, printers). xii + 583 pp. (Lytorhynchus paradoxus, pp. 191–192).
Whitaker R, Captain A (2008). Snakes of India: The Field Guide. Chennai: Draco Books. 495 pp. .

Colubrids
Reptiles of Pakistan
Reptiles described in 1875
Taxa named by Albert Günther
Reptiles of India